Ayşenur Taşbakan (born August 3, 1982) is a former European champion Turkish Taekwondo practitioner. Currently, she serves as a coach, and teaches physical education in a primary school.

She was born on August 5, 1982, in Kırklareli, Turkey. Taşbakan began practising taekwondo already in 1992. After winning the Turkish championship in her age category in 1995, she was admitted to the national team in 1996.

Taşbakan studied physical education and sports. After graduating, she began to work as a primary school teacher in Keçiören, Ankara. At the same time, she coaches Turkey national team and the Ankara Metropolitan Municipality's EGO Sports Club.

A multi-purpose sport hall in her hometown Kırklareli is named in her honor.

Achievements
  1998 World Championships - Istanbul, Turkey -59 kg youth
  2000 World Cup - Lyon, France -63 kg
  2000 European Championships - Patras, Greece -63 kg
  2001 World Cup - Ho Chi Minh City, Vietnam -63 kg
  2002 European Championships - Samsun, Turkey -63 kg

References

1982 births
People from Kırklareli
Turkish female taekwondo practitioners
Turkish female martial artists
Turkish schoolteachers
Turkish sports coaches
Living people
European Taekwondo Championships medalists
20th-century Turkish sportswomen
21st-century Turkish sportswomen